Viscount  was a Japanese businessman, central banker and the 8th Governor of the Bank of Japan (BOJ).  Viscount Mishima was a member of Japan's House of Peers.

Early life
Mishima was born in Kagoshima Prefecture.

In 1893, Mishima briefly married a daughter of Ōyama Iwao, whom he was forced to divorce when she caught tuberculosis. Their relationship was the basis for Kenjirō Tokutomi's popular 1899 novel The Cuckoo.

In 1894–1900 he studied at Cornell University in Ithaca, New York where he earned a M.A. degree.

Career
During 1911–1913, Mishima was head of the Yokohama Specie Bank.

Mishima was Governor of the Bank of Japan from February 28, 1913 to March 7, 1919. As head of the bank, Mishima encouraged policies of monetary restraint.

His sudden death in 1919 was unexpected.

See also
 Michiharu Mishima

Notes

References
 Metzler, Mark. (2006). Lever of Empire: the International Gold Standard and the Crisis of Liberalism in Prewar Japan. Berkeley: University of California Press. ; 
 Masaoka, Naoichi.  (1914).  Japan to America: A Symposium of Papers by Political Leaders and Representative Citizens of Japan on Conditions in Japan and on the Relations Between Japan and the United States.  New York: G.P. Putnam's Sons (Japan Society). 
 Smitka, Michael. (1998). The Interwar Economy of Japan: Colonialism, Depression, and Recovery, 1910-1940. New York: Garland. ;  

1867 births
1919 deaths
Cornell University alumni
Governors of the Bank of Japan
Japanese bankers
Members of the House of Peers (Japan)
People from Kagoshima